Natadha is a Bengali theatre group. located in Howrah, West Bengal. The theatre group started its journey in 1974. Shib Mukhopadhyay is the artistic director of this group.

History 
Natadha group was founded on 22 December 1974. The theatre group is located in Howrah, West Bengal. The first drama to be staged by this group was Aishwarik written and directed by Shib Mukhopadhyay. The group organises school theatre festival every year.

Productions 
(in alphabetical order)
 Aishwarik
 Bhitorer Mukh
 Caesar o Cleopatra
 Dakghar (of Rabindranath Tagore)
 Bishubishoy
 Ebang Socrates
 Eka Tughlaq
 Karna Ekhon
 Bishkaal
 Morossa
 Megh Name
 Palashi
 Raktakarabi
 Shakuntala

References

External links 
 

Bengali theatre groups
Theatre companies in India
Organisations based in West Bengal
1974 establishments in West Bengal
Arts organizations established in 1974